International:
 List of time zones by country – sorted by number of current time zones in the world
 List of UTC offsets – current UTC offsets
 List of time zone abbreviations – abbreviations 
 List of tz database time zones – zones used by many computer systems as defined by IANA
 List of military time zones

Country-specific:
 List of time zones by U.S. state

See also 
 :Category:Time by country 
 :Category:Time by continent